Y. Bhekhirst is an outsider musician based in New Hyde Park, New York. Although not much is known about him, his sole known record, Hot in the Airport, released in 1986 and re-released in 1994 on New Hyde Park-based label HDG Records, is prized by some outsider music collectors for its decidedly dadaistic, shambling songs. Both releases of Hot in the Airport were cassette-only, and this, along with a 7" vinyl single (released in 1986 and 1991) containing songs from the cassette, is in fact the label's only release to date.

For the most part, Hot in the Airport is full of meandering lyrics on mundane subjects such as cars, rain and love (although the song "Freshing Air" seems to deal with political prisoners in an unspecified country, containing the lyrics, "No more detention ... now!"), sung in a thick accent. Musically speaking, Bhekhirst's method is to sing a verse (in itself very repetitive) two, four or six times, then stop abruptly (although the cassette's final piece, "Every Time I", lasts for nearly seven minutes). This is typically backed up by one or two guitars, bass, and drums, with each of the stringed instruments playing a different melodic fragment, over and over again, creating a texture made up of several strange, angular, asynchronous patterns.  (It is not known whether the songs are the product of a band or one person repeatedly overdubbing parts on different instruments).  When these patterns are combined with the semi-random drumming and the atypical vocals, the effect is unique.

The title track of the cassette, which has been described as "oblique", was released contemporaneously as a 7" single, and has been anthologized in the compilation Interesting Results: Music by a Committee of One.  Slightly more polished musically than the other songs, it includes a number of lines sung in Spanish.

Information on Y. Bhekhirst is scarce. Irwin Chusid, who brought Bhekhirst's music to the public's attention in the mid-90s with Songs in the Key of Z, reported that a man calling himself Y. Bhekhirst was distributing his cassettes in New York record stores; handing them over to the clerks and then walking out abruptly without further explanation. Chusid and former colleague Michelle Boulé played selections from Hot in the Airport on numerous occasions when they worked together at station WFMU.

Searches at the U.S. Copyright Office have revealed that a man named José Hugo Díaz Guzmán (born in 1946 and also known as Pepe Díaz Guzmán) is somehow involved with Y's music, as the name "H. Díaz" or "H. Díazg" shows up on most known releases of material from Hot in the Airport. Some have speculated that Díaz Guzmán and Bhekhirst are in fact the same individual.

Under various pseudonyms (such as "Al Pol", "Al Phol", "Al Phool" and "Al Phooz"), Díaz Guzmán appears to have copyrighted numerous songs and cassette recordings, the earliest in 1981 and the latest in 1992.  If these recordings were made publicly available, they do not seem to have come to the attention of the outsider music community yet.

Discography
Albums
Hot in the Airport (1986)

References

External links
Website on Y. Bhekhirst

Outsider musicians
Living people
American male singers
Singers from New York (state)
People from New Hyde Park, New York
Unidentified musicians
Year of birth missing (living people)